Blenniella cyanostigma, the striped rockskipper, is a species of combtooth blenny found in coral reefs in the Indian Ocean.

References

cyanostigma
Fish described in 1849